Dorothy Caroline Atkinson (born 1966) is an English actress and singer. She has appeared in several plays by playwright Alan Ayckbourn and in films by Mike Leigh, including Topsy-Turvy, All or Nothing, and Mr. Turner, which premiered at the 2014 Cannes Film Festival, and for which she was nominated for the BIFA Award for Best Supporting Actress.

An April 2021 announcement stated that Atkinson would be joining the cast of the second season of All Creatures Great and Small as Diana Brompton.

Personal life
Atkinson is from Mansfield, Nottinghamshire. Her father was a bursar for a school in Nottinghamshire and she has one sister. Her nickname is "Dot". She is married to actor Martin Savage and they have one son.

Filmography

Film

Television

Theatre
Atkinson made her Broadway debut in the 2010 production of Brief Encounter, playing three roles (Dolly/Hermione/Beryl). This production was conceived originally with the Kneehigh Theatre Company (of which she is a member) and she stayed with the show when it moved to New York.

In 2009 Atkinson played Vera in Just Between Ourselves by Alan Ayckbourn at Northampton's Royal & Derngate Theatre. In 2006 she played Nora in Epitaph for George Dillon at the Comedy Theatre and in 2007 the Woman in A Matter of Life and Death at the National Theatre.
In 2003 she played Marie in the Royal Shakespeare Company's production of Beauty and the Beast by Laurence Boswell.

She has performed many shows at the Stephen Joseph Theatre with Alan Ayckbourn, including The Boy Who Fell Into a Book, in which she originated the role of the Queen in 1998.

In 2002, Atkinson was nominated for Best Supporting Actress for her performance in Eden End as Lillian, by the Barclays Theatre Awards, an award recognising regional British theatre.

References

External links
 
 

20th-century English actresses
21st-century English actresses
Living people
English film actresses
English musical theatre actresses
English radio actresses
English stage actresses
English television actresses
English voice actresses
Actresses from Nottinghamshire
People from Mansfield
1966 births